Tennis at the 2015 Island Games was held at the Caesarean Tennis Club, Jersey from 28 June to 3 July.

Medal Table

Results

References 

2015 Island Games
Island